Alexander Wilds Chambliss (September 10, 1864 – September 30, 1947) was the mayor of Chattanooga, Tennessee from 1919 to 1923 and a chief justice of the Tennessee Supreme Court. In 1946, he gave $30,000 to build the Alexander W. Chambliss Home in Chattanooga. Judge Chambliss was also a Freemason.

References 
 
 

1864 births
1947 deaths
Mayors of Chattanooga, Tennessee
Chief Justices of the Tennessee Supreme Court
Freemasonry in Tennessee